Mawk'ataray or Mawk'a Taray (Quechua mawk'a ancient, Taray a town, "old Taray", Hispanicized spelling Maukataray) is an archaeological site in Peru. It is located in the Cusco Region, Calca Province, Taray District.

See also 
 Pillku Urqu

References

Archaeological sites in Cusco Region
Archaeological sites in Peru